Þórður Guðmundsson (19 May 1908 – 19 October 1988) was an Icelandic water polo player. He competed in the men's tournament at the 1936 Summer Olympics.

References

1908 births
1988 deaths
Icelandic male water polo players
Olympic water polo players of Iceland
Water polo players at the 1936 Summer Olympics
Sportspeople from Reykjavík